Thomas Albert Ecke Van Dekker (December 20, 1905 – May 5, 1968) was an American character actor and politician best known for his roles in Dr. Cyclops, The Killers (1946), Kiss Me Deadly, and The Wild Bunch.

Early life and career
Dekker was born  in Brooklyn, New York City, the only child of Thomas and Grace Ecke Van Dekker. He attended Richmond Hill High School, where he appeared in stage productions. He then attended Bowdoin College, where he majored in pre-med with plans to become a doctor. On the advice of a friend, he decided to pursue acting as a career instead. He made his professional acting debut with a Cincinnati stock company in 1927. Within a few months, Dekker was featured in the Broadway production of Eugene O'Neill's play Marco Millions.

After a decade of theatrical appearances, Dekker transferred to Hollywood in 1937 and made his first film, 1937's The Great Garrick. He spent most of the rest of his acting career in the cinema but also returned to the stage from time to time.

He replaced Lee J. Cobb as Willy Loman in the original production of Arthur Miller's Death of a Salesman, and during a five-year stint back on Broadway in the early 1960s, he played the Duke of Norfolk in Robert Bolt's A Man for All Seasons.

Dekker appeared in some seventy films from the 1930s to the 1960s, but his four most famous screen roles were as a mad scientist in the 1940 horror film Dr. Cyclops, as a criminal mastermind in 1946's The Killers, as a dangerous dealer in atomic fuel in the 1955 film noir Kiss Me Deadly, and as an unscrupulous railroad detective in Sam Peckinpah's Western The Wild Bunch, released in 1969. In 1959 he played a convincing Texas Ranger, Captain Rucker, in The Wonderful Country. He was rarely cast in romantic roles, but in the film Seven Sinners, featuring a romance between Marlene Dietrich and John Wayne, Dietrich sails off with Dekker's character at the end of the film.  Dekker was an often memorable guest star – usually a villain – in numerous TV series from the 50s through to 1968, such as Rawhide, The Man From UNCLE, Mission: Impossible, Climax!, Bonanza, and I Spy. Dekker's role as Pat Harrigan in The Wild Bunch was his last screen appearance; he died over a year before it was released.

Personal life
On April 4, 1929, Dekker married former actress Esther Guerini. The couple had two sons, John and Benjamin, and a daughter, Jan, before divorcing in 1964.

In April 1957, Dekker's 16-year-old son, John, shot himself with a .22 rifle at the family's home in Hastings-on-Hudson, New York. He had reportedly been working on a silencer for the rifle for a year. His death was ruled accidental.

In his book-length account of the production of The Wild Bunch, writer W.K. Stratton describes Dekker as "completely nuts," and possibly the most troubled person on a set filled with eccentrics.  According to actor R.G. Armstrong, Dekker showed up to the remote Mexican shooting location of that film in 1968 with a thirteen-year-old girl he described as his wife, telling people (falsely) that he was a medical doctor, and that after filming he would retire from acting to help impoverished Africans.

Politics
Dekker's off-screen interest in politics led to his winning a seat in the California State Assembly for the 57th Assembly District in 1944. Dekker served as a Democratic member of the Assembly until 1946.

During the McCarthy era he was an outspoken critic of U.S. Senator Joseph McCarthy's tactics. As a result, Dekker was blacklisted in Hollywood and spent most of the blacklist period working on Broadway rather than in Hollywood (although he did work throughout the 1950's, including a part in Kiss Me Deadly).

Death
On May 5, 1968, Dekker was found dead in his Hollywood home by his fiancée, fashion model and future Love Boat creator Jeraldine Saunders.  He was naked, kneeling in the bathtub, with a noose tightly wrapped around his neck and looped around the shower curtain rod.  He was blindfolded, his wrists were handcuffed, there was a ball gag in his mouth, and two hypodermic needles were inserted in one arm. His body was covered in explicit words and drawings in red lipstick.

Money and camera equipment were missing, but there was no sign of forced entry. Police originally said it was suicide but the deputy coroner found no evidence of foul play nor any indication that he planned to take his life and ruled his death accidental, the result of autoerotic asphyxiation. Dekker was cremated, and his remains interred at the Garden State Crematory in North Bergen, New Jersey.

Dekker has a star, in the motion picture category, on the Hollywood Walk of Fame at 6620 Hollywood Boulevard.

Filmography

References

External links

 
 
 
 
 Join California Albert Dekker

1905 births
1968 deaths
20th-century American male actors
20th-century American politicians
Accidental deaths in California
American actor-politicians
American male film actors
American male stage actors
American male television actors
Bowdoin College alumni
Deaths from asphyxiation
Male Western (genre) film actors
Male actors from New York City
Democratic Party members of the California State Assembly
People from Hastings-on-Hudson, New York
Politicians from Brooklyn
Politicians from Los Angeles